Police Station is an American TV series that aired in 1959. Stories were taken from actual files from throughout the US.

Production and distribution 
The show was produced by Sandy Howard.

Harvey Bernhard served as associate producer and Glen MacWilliams was director of photography. Edward J. Allen, chief of police in Santa Ana, California, served as technical advisor. Edward Mann was supervising editor.

Other staff included John Burton as set dresser and Joe Franklin as script supervisor.

The series was produced by Official Films in association with Paramount-Sunset television productions.

39 episodes of 30 minutes were produced and aired in first-run syndication.

Plot summary 
The series follow the day-to-day work in a police station in Precinct 11 of a big city, from bookings to investigations. The plot in the pilot episode deal with the cases of a man charged with murdering his father; a woman charged with petty theft; and an out-of-towner arrested for attempted robbery.

Cast 
Baynes Barron as Sergeant White
Larry Kerr as Detective Chuck Mitchell
Henry Beckman as Detective Stan Abramson
Roy Wright as Detective Pat Green
Edward Platt as Desk Sgt.
Ron Masak
Michael Vandever as Derek
Jack Mann as Sgt. Battle

Reception 
According to KTLA spokesman Bob Reagan, the show "took a panning from the press" after the first episode.

References

External links 

1959 American television series debuts
1950s American police procedural television series
Year of television series ending missing
1950s American drama television series
English-language television shows
First-run syndicated television programs in the United States